Rebecca Schulz  (born July 30, 1984) is a Canadian politician who was elected in the 2019 Alberta general election to represent the electoral district of Calgary-Shaw in the 30th Alberta Legislature. She is a member of the United Conservative Party. She was appointed to the Executive Council of Alberta as the Minister of Children's Services on April 30, 2019, by Alberta Premier Jason Kenney.

Schulz was a candidate for leader of the United Conservative Party in 2022 following the resignation of Premier Jason Kenney as leader. Schulz placed fourth.

After the leadership race election, Premier Danielle Smith appointed Rebecca Schulz as the Minister of Municipal Affairs, she was sworn in on October 24, 2022.

Background 
Schulz holds a Master's degree in Communication from Johns Hopkins University and a Bachelor of Arts with Honours in English from the University of Saskatchewan. Before serving as an MLA, she worked as an event coordinator at the University of Ottawa-L'Hereux Dubé Social Justice Fund for seven months, a senior communications officer at SaskEnergy, and a media relations officer at the Government of Saskatchewan from 2009 to 2012. She also served as a manager of media relations at Saskatchewan Government Insurance from 2012 to 2013, and as Director of Communications at the Ministry of Education in the Government of Saskatchewan. Prior to becoming an MLA, she worked as Director of Alumni Marketing and Communications at the University of Calgary.

Rebecca Schulz grew in a small town in Saskatchewan. She and her husband, Cole moved to Alberta, and they have two young children, William and Lauren.

Political Career 
Mrs. Schulz was appointed to the Executive Council of Alberta as the Minister of Children's Services on April 30, 2019, by Alberta Premier Jason Kenney.   

After the leadership race election, Premier Danielle Smith appointed Rebecca Schulz as the Minister of Municipal Affairs, and she was sworn in on October 24, 2022.

As the Minister of Children's Services, she sponsored Bill 39, the Child Care Licensing (Early Learning and Child Care) Amendment Act, 2020. The bill passed on December 1, 2020. This Act is to be interpreted and applied in a manner that supports and preserves the safety, security, well-being, and development of the child in addition to flexible childcare choice and accessibility for families. Lastly, it seeks to engage parents, guardians, and community members in the provision of childcare supports the child's optimal development.

Changes under Bill 39 increased transparency and gave parents access to the information they need to help them choose the best child care option for their family. Changes also reduced red tape for providers and gave them more flexibility so they have more time to spend with children. Amendments incorporated feedback received from parents and caregivers, early childhood educators, child care operators, stakeholders and licensing staff during the first child care consultation in Alberta in more than a decade.

2022 Leadership Bid 
On June 14, 2022, Schulz resigned as the Minister of Children's Services and announced her candidacy in the 2022 United Conservative Party leadership election following the resignation of Premier Jason Kenney as leader. Her leadership campaign was supported by co-chairs Rona Ambrose, Calgary MP Stephanie Kusie, MLA Jeremy Nixon, MLA Ric McIver, MLA Jason Copping. Schulz placed fourth in the leader race and eliminated with 8.4% vote in round 4.

Electoral history

References

Politicians from Calgary
United Conservative Party MLAs
Living people
Women MLAs in Alberta
Members of the Executive Council of Alberta
Women government ministers of Canada
21st-century Canadian women politicians
1984 births